Sirisinagandla is a village (gram panchayat) in Kondapak Mandal, Medak district in the Indian state of Telangana, India.

References 

Villages in Medak district